Luis "El Mulo" Padrón Otorena (ca. 1878 – 1939) was a Cuban baseball player in the Negro leagues and Cuban League.

Padron played from 1902 to 1917 with several Cuban ballclubs, including Habana, San Francisco, Club Fé, San Francisco Park, and Almendares. He played in the Negro leagues in 1909 and 1911 for the Cuban Stars (West), and in 1915 and 1916 for the Long Branch/Jersey City/Poughkeepsie Cubans.

Padron also played in the Minor leagues, playing in the South Atlantic League, Connecticut State League, Illinois–Indiana–Iowa League, Ohio–Pennsylvania League, New York–New Jersey League, and the Atlantic League.

He was elected to the Cuban Baseball Hall of Fame in 1943.

References

External links

1870s births
1939 deaths
Cuban League players
Cuban baseball players
Almendares (baseball) players
Club Fé players
Punzo players
Jacksonville Jays players
New Britain Perfectos players
Peoria Distillers players
Mansfield Brownies players
Habana players
Long Branch Cubans players
San Francisco Park players
San Francisco (baseball) players
Cuban Stars (West) players
Sportspeople from Matanzas